John Eakin Farm, also known as Jacob Kooker Tavern, is a historic farm and national historic district located at Springfield Township, Bucks County, Pennsylvania. It encompasses 15 contributing buildings, 2 contributing sites, and 1 contributing structure. They are three houses, two barns, one wagon shed, two smokehouses, one spring house, one outhouse, one garage, one milk house, one chicken house, and the ruins of an out kitchen, lime quarry, lime kiln and two sheds.  The most notable building is the Jacob Kooker Tavern, the oldest section of which dates to 1739.  A tavern occupied the building from 1761 to about 1797.

It was added to the National Register of Historic Places in 2005.

References

Farms on the National Register of Historic Places in Pennsylvania
Historic districts in Bucks County, Pennsylvania
Historic districts on the National Register of Historic Places in Pennsylvania
National Register of Historic Places in Bucks County, Pennsylvania